Lord Alexander Francis Charles Gordon-Lennox (14 June 1825 – 22 January 1892), was a British Conservative politician.

Background
Gordon-Lennox was the fourth son of Charles Gordon-Lennox, 5th Duke of Richmond, and Lady Caroline, daughter of Field Marshal Henry Paget, 1st Marquess of Anglesey. Charles Gordon-Lennox, 6th Duke of Richmond and Lord Henry Lennox were his elder brothers and Lord George Gordon-Lennox his younger brother.

Political career
Gordon-Lennox was elected Member of Parliament for New Shoreham in 1849, a seat he held until 1859. He was also a Captain in the Royal Horse Guards.

Family
Gordon-Lennox married Emily, daughter of Colonel Charles Towneley and Lady Caroline Molyneux, in 1863. The marriage produced one son, Cosmo Charles Gordon-Lennox (1869–1921), who married the actress Marie Tempest, and died childless. Lord Alexander died in January 1892, aged 66. His wife died in December of the same year.

References

External links 
 

1825 births
1892 deaths
Younger sons of dukes
Conservative Party (UK) MPs for English constituencies
UK MPs 1847–1852
UK MPs 1852–1857
UK MPs 1857–1859